Scott Mahlke from the University of Michigan, Ann Arbor, MI was named Fellow of the Institute of Electrical and Electronics Engineers (IEEE) in 2015 for contributions to compiler code generation and automatic processor customization.

References

Fellow Members of the IEEE
Living people
University of Michigan faculty
Year of birth missing (living people)
Place of birth missing (living people)
American electrical engineers